This is a list of seasons played by Linköpings FC, a Swedish women's football club created in 2003 and based in Linköping.

Summary

Swedish football club seasons
Women's football club seasons